Insular G (font: Ᵹ ᵹ) is a form of the letter g somewhat resembling a tailed z, used in the medieval insular script of  Great Britain and Ireland. It was first used in the Roman Empire in Roman cursive, then it appeared in Irish half uncial (insular) script, and after it had passed into Old English, it developed into the Middle English letter yogh (Ȝ ȝ). Middle English, having reborrowed the familiar Carolingian g from the Continent, began to use the two forms of g as separate letters.

Letter

Its capital (Ᵹ) was introduced in Unicode 5.1 (April 2008) at U+A77D. The insular g is one of several insular letters encoded into Unicode. Few fonts will display all of the symbols, but some will display the lowercase insular g (ᵹ) and the tironian et (⁊). Two fonts that support the other characters are Junicode and Tehuti.

The insular form of g is still used in traditional Gaelic script.

Turned insular g
A turned version of insular g (Ꝿ ꝿ) was used by William Pryce to designate the velar nasal ŋ.

See also
Insular script

References

External links
 Drawing an insular G (here mistaken for yogh)
 Michael Everson's article On the derivation of YOGH and EZH shows insular g in several typefaces.

G insular
Anglo-Saxon literature
G insular